Abner Teixeira da Silva Júnior (born 10 September 1996) is a Brazilian boxer. He competed in the men's heavyweight event at the 2020 Summer Olympics.

References

External links
 

1996 births
Living people
Brazilian male boxers
Olympic boxers of Brazil
Boxers at the 2020 Summer Olympics
Olympic bronze medalists for Brazil
Olympic medalists in boxing
Medalists at the 2020 Summer Olympics
Place of birth missing (living people)
Pan American Games bronze medalists for Brazil
Pan American Games medalists in boxing
Boxers at the 2019 Pan American Games
Medalists at the 2019 Pan American Games
Sportspeople from São Paulo (state)
20th-century Brazilian people
21st-century Brazilian people